Manitoba Junction is an unincorporated community in Highland Grove Township, Clay County, Minnesota, United States. It is named for a railroad junction of the Northern Pacific Railway, where a branch to Winnipeg joined the main line. These tracks are now owned by BNSF Railway.

Notes

External links 
 Upham, Warren, "Manitoba Junction, Minnesota Place Names, p. 122.

Unincorporated communities in Clay County, Minnesota
Unincorporated communities in Minnesota
Former Northern Pacific Railway stations